Jaylon Jones (born April 3, 2002) is an American football cornerback for the Texas A&M Aggies.

High school career
Jones attended Byron P. Steele II High School in Cibolo, Texas. As a senior in 2019 Under Armour All-American. A five-star recruit, Jones committed to Texas A&M University to play college football.

College career
Jones started all 10 games as a true freshman at Texas A&M in 2020. He finished the season with 30 tackles and one interception. As a sophomore in 2021, he started all 13 games, recording 35 tackles and two interceptions. He returned to A&M as a starter in 2022.

References

External links
Texas A&M Aggies bio

Living people
Players of American football from Texas
American football cornerbacks
Texas A&M Aggies football players
2002 births